"Charles Guiteau" (LAWS E11) Roud 444 is a traditional song about the assassination of US President James A. Garfield by Charles J. Guiteau.  It is based on another old ballad, "James A. Rogers". The song is told from the point of view of the assassin himself.

For a while, it was believed that Guiteau wrote the song himself, possibly because of the poem "I am Going to the Lordy", which Guiteau actually did write on the day of his execution.

It is not to be confused with another ballad about the assassination, "Mr. Garfield," which was  popularized by Johnny Cash. Bascom Lamar Lunsford recorded both songs in 1949 for the Library of Congress. There exists a handwritten document of a folk song " Charles Guiteau's Life" written by Inez Conner listed as authoress. The page has four stanzas, it is noted on the paper a gift to "Mr. Charley Grant, Mt. Claire, Nuckolls county, Nebraska. August 2, 1890.

Recordings
  Norman Blake
  Bascom Lamar Lunsford on Songs and Ballads of American History and the Assassination of Presidents recorded 1949, released by Library of Congress 1952, re-released by Rounder 1998
  Kelly Harrell 1927 on Anthology of American Folk Music, Smithsonian Folkways 1997
 Ramblin' Jack Elliot circa 1955 on compilation Badmen, Heroes and Pirates, mono LP release (out of print)
 Dave Fredrickson and Crabgrass, circa 1960, on Arhoolie LP 4001, reissued on CD 518-B in conjunction with book Hear Me Howling! Blues, Ballads & Beyond, recorded by Chris Strachwitz with text by Adam Machado (El Cerrito, CA: Arhoolie Productions, 2010).

See also 
 I am Going to the Lordy
 Assassins (musical)

References
5. Smith, Rick, handwritten document from Aug.2, 1890 in my possession.

Songs about criminals
Songs about presidents of the United States
Cultural depictions of James A. Garfield
Cultural depictions of assassins
Bascom Lamar Lunsford songs
Murder ballads
American songs
1882 songs
Assassination of James A. Garfield
Songwriter unknown